The Stadio di Baseball di Serravalle is a baseball stadium in Serravalle, San Marino. The stadium has a capacity of 1,500.

See also
Stadio Olimpico

References

Baseball in San Marino
Serravalle (San Marino)
Sports venues in San Marino
Baseball venues in Europe